George McLuckie (19 September 1931 – 2011) was a Scottish professional footballer. During his career he made 141 appearances for Ipswich Town from 1953 to 1958.

External links 
George MacLuckie at Pride of Anglia
http://www.neilbrown.newcastlefans.com/player1/georgemacluckie.html

2011 deaths
1931 births
Association football wingers
Blackburn Rovers F.C. players
Ipswich Town F.C. players
Reading F.C. players
Scottish footballers
Footballers from Falkirk
English Football League players
Poole Town F.C. players
Lochore Welfare F.C. players
Date of death missing
Place of death missing